Aydarov (masculine) or Aydarova (feminine) is a Russian last name. It derives either from the Turkic male first name Aydar, which was occasionally used by Russians as a secular name, or from the Volga region dialectal word "" (aydar), which referred to a certain type of a Cossack haircut and was used as a nickname given to people with that kind of haircut.

People with the last name
Alexei Aidarov (Alexey Aydarov) (b. 1974), Ukrainian biathlete
Sergei Aydarov (b. 1998), Russian footballer
Sergey Aydarov, actor playing a steward in the 1922 Soviet movie Polikushka

See also
Aydarovo, several rural localities in Russia

References

Notes

Sources
Ю. А. Федосюк (Yu. A. Fedosyuk). "Русские фамилии: популярный этимологический словарь" (Russian Last Names: a Popular Etymological Dictionary). Москва, 2006. 



Russian-language surnames